Macromolecular cages have three dimensional chambers surrounded by a molecular framework. Macromolecular cage architectures come in various sizes ranging from 1-50 nm and have varying topologies as well as functions. They can be synthesized through covalent bonding or self-assembly through non-covalent interactions. Most macromolecular cages that are formed through self-assembly are sensitive to pH, temperature, and solvent polarity.

Metal Organic Polyhedra 

Metal Organic Polyhedra (MOPs) comprise a specific type of self-assembled macromolecular cage that is formed through unique coordination and is typically chemically and thermally stable. MOPs have cage-like frameworks with an enclosed cavity. The discrete self-assembly of metal ions and organic scaffolds to form MOPs into highly symmetrical architectures, is a modular process and has various applications. The self-assembly of various subunits that result in high symmetry is a common occurrence in biological systems. Specific examples of this are ferritin, capsid, and the tobacco mosaic virus, which are formed by the self-assembly of protein subunits into a polyhedral symmetry. Nonbiological polyhedra formed with metal ions and organic linkers are metal based macromolecular cages that have nanocavities with multiple openings or pores that allow small molecules to permeate and pass through. MOPs have been used to encapsulate a number of guests through various host-guest interactions (e.g. electrostatic interactions, hydrogen bonding, and steric interactions). MOPs are biomimetic materials that have potential for biomedical and biochemical applications. In order for the cage to work effectively and have biomedical relevance, it has to be chemically stable, biocompatible, and needs to operate mechanistically in aqueous media. Macromolecular cages in general can be used for a variety of applications (e.g. nanoencapsulation, biosensing, drug delivery, regulation of nanoparticle synthesis, and catalysis).

Cage Shaped Polymers 
There are also a class of macromolecular cages that are synthetically formed through covalent bonding as opposed to self-assembly. Through the covalent-bond-forming strategy the cage molecules can be synthesized methodically with customizable functionality and regulated cavity size. Cage-shaped polymers are macromolecular analogues of molecular cages such as cryptand. A cage molecule of this type can be tuned by the degree of polymerization. The polymers that are typically used to make the polymer based macromolecular cages are made with star shaped polymers or nonlinear polymer precursors. The molecular size of the polymeric macromolecular cage is controlled by the molecular weight of the star-shaped polymer or branched polymer. The macromolecular cages made from non-linear polymers are designed to have molecular recognition, respond to external stimuli and self-assemble into higher order structures.

Fullerenes 
Fullerenes are a class of carbon allotropes that were first discovered in 1985 and are also an example of macromolecular cages. Buckminsterfullerene (C60) and the 60 atoms of this molecule are arranged in a cage-like structure and the framework resembles a soccer ball; the molecule has an icosahedral symmetry. C60 has versatile applications due to its macromolecular cage structure; for example, it can be used for water purification, catalysis, bio-pharmaceuticals, serve as a carrier of radionuclides for MRI, and drug delivery.

Macromolecular Cage Architecture in Biology 

There are many examples of highly symmetrical macromolecular cage motifs known as protein cages in biological systems. The term protein cage delineates a diverse range of protein structures that are formed by the self-assembly of protein subunits into hollow macromolecular nanoparticles. These protein cages are nanoparticles that have one or more cavities present in their structure. The size of the cavity contributes to the size of the particle that the cavity can enclose, for example inorganic nanoparticles, nucleic acids, and even other proteins. The interior or chamber portion of the protein cage is usually accessible through a pore which is located in between protein subunits. The RNA exosome has nuclease active sites that are present in a cavity where 3' RNA degradation takes place; access to this cavity is controlled by a pore and this serves to prevent uncontrollable RNA decay. Some protein cages are dynamic structures that assemble and disassemble in response to external stimuli. Other examples of protein cages are clathrin cages, viral envelopes, chaperonins, and the iron storage protein ferritin.

Synthetic Strategies to form Macromolecular Cages 
There are various methods used to form polymeric macromolecular cages. One synthetic method uses ring opening and multiple click chemistry in the first step to form trefoil and quatrefoil-shaped polymers, which can then be topologically converted into cages using hydrogenolysis. The initiator in this synthesis is azido and hydroxy functionalized p-xylene and the monomer is butylene oxide. The ring opening polymerization and simultaneous click cyclizations of butylene oxide with the initiator is catalyzed by t-Bu-P4. This synthetic strategy was used to form cage-shaped polybutylene oxides; cage-shaped block copolymers are also formed using a similar method. One synthetic strategy utilizes atom transfer radical polymerization and click chemistry methods to form figure eight and cage-shaped polystyrene; in this case the precursor is nonlinear polystyrene. Another synthetic strategy employs intramolecular ring-opening metathesis oligomerization of a star polymer and this reaction method is catalyzed by diluted Grubb's third generation catalyst.

Covalent Organic Frameworks (COFs) have also been used to form cage architectures and in one such example Schiff base cyclization was used to form the macromolecular cage molecule. In this synthesis 1,3,5-triformylbenzene and (R,R)-(1,2)-diphenylethylenediamine undergo cycloimination in dichloromethane with trifluoroacetic acid as a catalyst to form a COF cage molecule. Macrocyclizations have also been employed to form peptoid based macromolecular cages, the specific methodology utilizes a one pot synthesis to form steroid-aryl hybrid cages using two- and three-fold Ugi type macrocyclization reactions.

Genetically engineered macromolecular cages made from biomolecules 
Macromolecular cages can also be formed synthetically using biomolecules. Protein cages can be genetically engineered, and the outside of the cage can be tailored with synthetic polymers, which is known as protein-polymer conjugation. Preformed polymer chains can be attached to the surface of the protein using chemical linkers. Polymerization can also occur from the protein surface, and the polymer can also be bound to the surface of protein cages via electrostatic interactions. The purpose of this modification is to make synthetic protein cages more biocompatible; this post synthetic modification makes the protein cage less susceptible to an immune response and stabilizes the cage from degradation from proteases. Virus-like protein (VLP) cages have also been synthesized and recombinant DNA technology is used to form non-native virus-like proteins. The first reported case of the formation of non-native VLP constructs into a capsid-like structure utilized a functionalized gold core for nucleation. The self-assembly of the VLP was initiated by the electrostatic interaction of the functionalized gold nanoparticles which is similar to the interaction of a native virus with its nucleic acid component. These viral protein cages have potential applications in biosensing and medical imaging. DNA origami is another strategy to form macromolecular cages or containers. In one case, a 3D macromolecular cage with icosahedral symmetry (resembling viral capsids) was formed based on the synthetic strategy in 2D origami. The structure had an inside volume or hollow cavity encased by triangular faces, similar to a pyramid. This close-faced cage was designed to potentially encapsulate other materials such as proteins and metal nanoparticles.

References

Macromolecules